Misako Odani (小谷美紗子) (born November 4, 1976 in Miyazu, Kyoto-fu), is a Japanese singer, songwriter, and pianist. Misako, whose songs make heavy use of the piano, began playing the instrument at age seven, and studied abroad in Australia in 1994. Since entering the music industry in 1996, she has released eight albums, and many singles. Her most recent album, Koto no Ha (ことの は), was released in May 2010.

Discography

Filmography
April 21, 1999 弾き語る (Hikigataru), a compilation of music videos and behind-the-scenes clips of recording sessions.

References

External links
Official Website (Japanese)

1976 births
Living people
Japanese pianists
Japanese women pianists
Musicians from Kyoto Prefecture
21st-century Japanese pianists
21st-century Japanese women musicians
21st-century women pianists